The list of Dan Dare stories details appearances of the character Dan Dare, created by Frank Hampson.

The original Eagle stories
These are the Dan Dare stories that appeared in the original Eagle magazine, which ran from 1950 to 1969 and featured the hero Dan Dare. The stories would often take place as parts of longer story arcs, and when this happened the stories are grouped together as such. These storylines were reprinted by Hawk Books in the late 1980s and early 1990s, and as of May, 2009, the first ten stories have been reprinted again by Titan Books. The series of twelve hardbacks, each about 100 pages, splits Voyage to Venus and Operation Saturn across two volumes each. After a brief hiatus, the following two stories, 'Man From Nowhere' and 'Rogue Planet' were released in 2008, with The Phantom Fleet and Safari in Space continuing publication into 2009.

Three stories (Man From Nowhere, Rogue Planet, Reign of the Robots) were reproduced in the early 1980s by Dragon's Dream. The first of these books was particularly notable because the front page panel with the Eagle logo was replaced with new artwork drawn by Dan Dare's creator Frank Hampson.

Hampson used a studio system with several artists working together on each episode. These included Bruce Cornwell, Don Harley and Keith Watson.

This story was followed by a reprint of Prisoners of Space
(Volume 18, Number 2 to Volume 18, Number 51)

This story was followed by a reprint of The Man From Nowhere (Volume 19, Number 4 to Volume 19, Number 32) and an abridged reprint of Rogue Planet (Volume 19, Number 33 to Volume 20, Number 17).

The original Eagle's run then came to an end when it was merged with Lion comic. Abridged reprints continued in black and white in Lion.

2000AD
Between 1977 and 1981 the Dan Dare character was revived to appear in the new 2000AD comic. For the first 45 progs (issues) of the comic, "Dan Dare" was considered to be the "lead" strip, and hence held the coveted centre-spread position, thus allowing the first two pages of the strip to be printed in colour. From prog 46 to prog 58, Dare was moved to the front cover, a move that not only allowed the fan favourite Judge Dredd to take the centre spread, but which also meant that by dispensing with the traditional single-image cover, the comic could effectively have an extra page of content.

The relaunched Eagle comic
In 1982 Eagle was re-launched, with Dan Dare once again its flagship strip. The new character was the great-great-grandson of the original, with the only other surviving original character being the Mekon, although a descendant of Digby was later introduced:
 Return of the Mekon issues #1-33

Revolver
In 1990, a strip entitled Dare, written by Grant Morrison and drawn by Rian Hughes, was serialized in Revolver. It presented bleak and cynical characters and was a not-too-subtle satire of 1980s British politics. Spacefleet had been privatised, the Treens were subjected to racist abuse in urban ghettos, Digby was unemployed, Professor Peabody committed suicide, and Dare's mentor Sir Hubert Guest betrayed Dare to the Mekon and his quisling British Prime Minister, Gloria Munday (whose appearance and demeanour appear modelled on Margaret Thatcher). Ultimately, Dare destroys London, the Mekon and himself through a smuggled nuclear weapon.

The Planet
In 1996, The Planet published its first and only issue. Inside was a new and unfinished Dan Dare story, "Remembrance", drawn by Sydney Jordan featuring a slightly older Dare and apparently set some years after the original Eagle strips.

Virgin Comics
In 2008, Virgin Comics published a 7-issue Dan Dare mini-series written by Garth Ennis, with art by Gary Erskine. The series is set several years after the original strips. Space Fleet has collapsed along with the UN due to nuclear war between China and America; Britain survived due to defensive shields made by Professor Peabody, and has become a world power again as a result with the Royal Navy taking Space Fleet's role. Peabody is the home secretary to a prime minister modelled on Tony Blair, who has sold Earth's defence out to The Mekon out of fear of overwhelming odds. Dare, assisted by Digby (who sacrifices himself in battle) leads a spirited defence of both Earth and his honourable principles.

Notes and references

External links
 An Introduction to Dan Dare
 The Eagle and Dan Dare
 Dan Dare Around the World
 
 Dan Dare at the London Science Museum
The official Science Museum print website containing a number of Dan Dare posters

2000 AD comic strips
Dan Dare
Dan Dare